Donald Cole (October 31, 1930 in New York, New York) is an American abstract expressionist painter. He received a BS from Bucknell University and an MFA from the University of Iowa. He served in the Navy during the Korean War. He now lives on Vashon Island in Washington with wife Joan Wortis, also a visual artist.

His work has been exhibited in New York at 55 Mercer Gallery, French & Co., the Nancy Hoffman Gallery and the Frank Marino Gallery. Northwest showings include the Foster/White Gallery, the Jeffrey Moose Gallery and the ArtXchange Gallery in Seattle, two Tacoma Art Museum biennials and Gallery 070 on Vashon Island. He has work in a number of private and public collections, including the Portland Art Museum, the Worcester Art Museum, and the ARCO Center for Visual Art, Los Angeles.

References
(April, 2021), "Precision and Freedom: A History of Donald Cole", Artxchange, Seattle, WA
(July 13, 2010), "Art Briefs", Vashon Maury Island Beachcomber
Barry, Ann (January 22, 1975), "Arts and Leisure Guide", The New York Times
Glueck, Gracie (November 28, 1970). "Art: A Downtown Scene", The New York Times
(November 22, 1970). "What's New in Art", The New York Times

20th-century American painters
American male painters
21st-century American painters
Abstract painters
Bucknell University alumni
University of Iowa alumni
Living people
People from Vashon, Washington
Year of birth missing (living people)
20th-century American male artists